Aminata Traoré (born 25 February 1999) is an Ivorian taekwondo practitioner.

Career
She competed at the 2017 and 2018 World Championships. She came third at the 2018 African Championship and third at the 2019 African Games. She won the 2021 African Championships in Dakar. She was selected for the Taekwondo at the 2020 Summer Olympics – Women's +67 kg.

References

External links
 

1999 births
Living people
Taekwondo practitioners at the 2020 Summer Olympics
Ivorian female taekwondo practitioners
Olympic taekwondo practitioners of Ivory Coast
21st-century Ivorian women